Carnalea is a townland west of Bangor, County Down, Northern Ireland. It consists of the Killaire area, Station Road area and Seymour area and falls under the control of Ards and North Down Borough Council and within the Bangor West electoral boundary. Carnalea is bordered by Belfast Lough to the North, Crawfordsburn to the immediate West, Wandsworth and Springhill/Rathmore to the immediate South, and Bryansburn to the East, which then leads into Bangor town centre. The area has seen relatively increased development in recent years, notably with the creation of Carnalea Glen, Station Court, and Killaire Court. The closure of the Carnalea Mini-Market after Christmas of 2005 has led to the site's redevelopment for residential use, such is the high demand for housing in the area.

Station Road, off the Crawfordsburn Road, is the central area of Carnalea and leads to Carnalea railway station, Carnalea Golf Club, the North Down coastal path and a private road of modern dwellings in the grounds of a former manor. Recently, the Carnalea Residents Association, in conjunction with the Police Service of Northern Ireland (PSNI), implemented a Neighbourhood Watch scheme in order to maintain the high standards of living and social security that are synonymous with the general North Down area.

Places of interest 

Carnalea Golf Club - An 18-hole course is situated on the coast with panoramic views of Belfast Lough and adjacent to the North Down coastal path. The clubhouse at Carnalea began renovation in March 2007. As well as a picturesque golf course, Carnalea Golf club also boasts a bar, restaurant, separate function room, and Snooker room. These facilities regularly entice the visit of professional footballer Keith Gillespie.

North Down Coastal Path - Stretching from Bangor to Holywood and overlooking Belfast Lough, the coastal path is popular with ramblers, dog walkers, runners and cyclists (it is an official cycle path as of January 2010). Alternative access to the coastal path is via Kerr's Wood, a tree-lined pathway originating at the Crawfordsburn Road.

Travel 
The Carnalea area is served by Carnalea railway station and two bus stops with both services provided by Translink. The railway station was refurbished by Translink, with the aid of the Carnalea Residents Association in the summer of 2005. Journey times by train to Belfast and Bangor are approximately forty minutes and five minutes respectively operated by Northern Ireland Railways.

Elderly issues 
The population of Carnalea is predominantly elderly. Local nursing home Ailsa Lodge is situated in the Killaire area, whilst another care home bearing Carnalea's name, the Four Seasons Carnalea Nursing Home lies closer towards Bangor town centre in Bryansburn, outside the commonly accepted Carnalea border. Just beside the Seymour area is another cluster of elderly housing, a private area known as Worcester Avenue.

Religion 
Carnalea falls within the Church of Ireland Diocese of Down and Dromore, which in Roman Catholic terms is the Diocese of Down and Connor. There are two local churches bearing the Carnalea title, but, much like the Four Seasons Carnalea Nursing Home, only one falls within what would be generally accepted as the Carnalea area. Saint Gall's Parish of Carnalea is an Anglican/Episcopalian place of worship, and is situated at the edge of Carnalea, on the Crawfordsburn Road, beside Bryansburn Rangers FC's Ballywooley Playing Fields. Its Summer Fête and May Fair are particularly popular with local residents. Much further afield is Carnalea Methodist Church, which has undergone considerable redevelopment in the past year in order to modernise the church grounds. It is the home of the popular Carnalea Wado Kai Karate Club and Carnalea Methodist Youth Club. It lies in the Springhill (Bangor suburb) area of Bangor, commonly known as Rathmore.

References

External links
Carnalea Golf Club 

Bangor, County Down
Townlands of County Down